Justin Tranter is an American singer-songwriter and activist. After mediocre success as a singer, more commonly as the frontman of rock band Semi Precious Weapons, Tranter turned for writing for other artists and developed a close writing partnership with Julia Michaels. During that time, they have scored numerous Billboard chart-toppers and was labelled as one of Rolling Stone's "20 Biggest Breakouts of 2015" for their writing efforts of that year.

This list of songs is split into the full list of contributions and those that have performed in the charts across various countries. Additionally, the international singles and certifications are placed by order of the song's initial release, which may coincide with an album release.

International singles and certifications

Full discography

References

External links
 

Tranter, Justin